Andy Sanborn is a former Republican member of the New Hampshire Senate, representing the 9th district between 2012 and 2018, and previously the 7th district from 2010 to 2012.

Early life, education and career
Sanborn was born in Lebanon, New Hampshire. He studied marketing, finance, and economics at New England College. He worked in commercial lending for 15 years and was employed by an international leasing company in Chicago. Sanborn owns The Draft sports bar in Concord and is on the board of the New Hampshire Lodging and Restaurant Association.

Sanborn also owns and leases real estate. His tenants at Phat Stuff, a head shop in Keene, were raided by the DEA in 2014.

Positions
Sanborn had consistently been rated one of the most conservative members of the New Hampshire State Senate. He touts himself as the "Conservative Conscious" of the New Hampshire Senate. In 2017 he passed six new bills into law.

Marijuana legalization
In January 2014, Sanborn was the subject of a public controversy regarding a contentious email exchange with a constituent over the issue of marijuana legalization. An email from a constituent supporting marijuana legalization received a heated response from Sanborn, who opposes legalization, including legislation making its way through the state legislature. Sanborn wrote in the email, "I’m thinking if I call the [organization you received a scholarship from] and ask their opinion on legalization, they may have a different opinion (not to mention may be asking you for their scholarship money back…)."

The constituent was believed to be a college freshman and a recipient of a scholarship, information that Sanborn declined to say how it was obtained. Sanborn responded to the controversy thus: "My e-mail was not a suggestion that I could or would work to revoke any scholarship, only to highlight that those involved with awarding him those funds may have made a different decision had he expressed similar pro-marijuana legalization efforts to them when applying."

Health care
Sanborn is opposed to the Patient Protection and Affordable Care Act and compared it to the crash of Asiana Airlines Flight 214. He also opposed the creation of a state-run exchange under the act.

Electoral history
Sanborn made an unsuccessful run for the District 7 seat in the New Hampshire Senate in 2008. He ran again in 2010, this time successfully. After redistricting, he ran in District 9, defeating Lee C. Nyquist in the 2012 general election. Sanborn considered running for governor in the 2014 elections, but announced he would no longer be seeking the Republican nomination on September 27, 2013. He was reelected in 2014 and again in 2016. In the 2016 election he was the top vote getter inside his district beating his opponent by eight points while Hillary Clinton also won the district.

Legislative committees
Sanborn was a member of the following committees:
Ways & Means Committee (chair)
Election Law & Internal Affairs

Personal life
Sanborn is married to Laurie Sanborn, a representative for Hillsborough 41 in the New Hampshire House of Representatives.

References

External links

|-

Living people
New England College alumni
Republican Party New Hampshire state senators
People from Lebanon, New Hampshire
21st-century American politicians
Year of birth missing (living people)